The Reina Nacional de Belleza Miss República Dominicana 2007 pageant will be held on October 27, 2006. This year only 18 candidates are competing for the national crown. The chosen winner will represent the Dominican Republic at the Miss International 2007 and other small international pageant which was held in Tokyo.

Results

Special awards
 Miss Photogenic (voted by press reporters) - Catherine Ramírez (La Vega)
 Miss Congeniality (voted by Miss Dominican Republic Universe contestants) - Alina Espinal (La Romana)
 Best Face - Aimeé Melo (Distrito Nacional)
 Best Provincial Costume - Mariela Rosario (Peravia)
 Best Hair - Daniela Peguero (San Cristóbal)
 Miss Elegancia - Fania Marte (Valverde)

Delegates

Trivia
 Miss Peravia and Miss Distrito Nacional entered in Miss Dominican Republic Universe 2006.
 Miss La Vega would enter in Miss Dominican Republic 2010

External links
 Reina Nacional de Belleza 2007

Miss Dominican Republic
2007 in the Dominican Republic
2007 beauty pageants